The 1979 Central American and Caribbean Championships in Athletics were held at the Estadio Revolución in Guadalajara, Jalisco, Mexico 15–17 June 1979.

Medal summary

Men's events

Women's events

A = affected by altitude

Medal table

External links
Men Results – GBR Athletics
Women Results – GBR Athletics

Central American and Caribbean Championships in Athletics
Central American and Caribbean Championships
Central American and Caribbean Championships in Athletics
International athletics competitions hosted by Mexico
Sport in Guadalajara, Jalisco